Don Knodel is an American college basketball coach. He was the head coach at Rice University from 1966 to 1974; in 1970, the Owls won the Southerst Conference title as the best team in the season, which as of 2023 ranks as the last conference championship in basketball for the program.

Head coaching record

References

Living people
Year of birth missing (living people)
American men's basketball players
Miami RedHawks men's basketball players
American men's basketball coaches
Miami RedHawks men's basketball coaches
Vanderbilt Commodores men's basketball coaches
Rice Owls men's basketball coaches
Women's Professional Basketball League coaches